The Men's synchronized 10 metre platform competition of the diving events at the 2015 World Aquatics Championships was held on 26 July 2015.

Results
The prelimanry round was held at 10:00. The final was held at 19:30.

Green denotes finalists

References

Men's synchronized 10 metre platform